The Muppet Show is a live-action/puppet television series that was created by Jim Henson and produced by ITC Entertainment and Henson Associates. It premiered on 5 September 1976 and ended on 23 May 1981, with a total of 120 episodes over the course of 5 seasons.

The rights to the series are currently owned by The Muppets Studio (a division of The Walt Disney Company), having been acquired from The Jim Henson Company in February 2004.

The 120 episodes were produced in the UK between 1976 and 1980; two pilot episodes were also produced, one in 1974 and the other in 1975. The UK broadcasts featured extra scenes that were not seen on US TV. There is no set broadcast order for the episodes, as they were shown in varying order in different regions. For the Season One DVD box set that was released in 2005, Buena Vista Home Entertainment placed the episodes in the order in which they were produced, rather than aired, for this reason. Due to the sequence in which the episodes are organized on DVD disc 1, Scooter is part of the backstage staff before his first appearance (Jim Nabors episode). The set also includes the longer UK versions of each of the episodes, though six song sequences were cut from the set because of licensing issues. It is common for television executives to insist on an edit of video release rather than pay money to the owners of the copyright of songs. Examples include the Vincent Price episode, the closing number of which, "You've Got a Friend", is cut on The Muppet Show: Season One DVD; it is available uncut and in English on the German DVD.

The tables below list episodes based on their initial airing dates, for the United Kingdom, except for the two pilots. Thus they may not necessarily be the order in which episodes were shown in all regions.

The Muppet Show was released for streaming on Disney+ on 19 February 2021. However, two episodes featuring guests Brooke Shields and Chris Langham are omitted from the streaming service, the former due to music licensing issues, and the latter possibly due to the actor's child pornography arrest. In several European countries, the episode featuring John Denver is omitted as well.

Episodes

Pilots (1974–75)
The first pilot opens with a character called Wally and develops as he types the script on his typewriter. In the second pilot, a new character called Nigel acts as the backstage boss. Statler and Waldorf grumble from a living room while watching the show on television. (This setting for Statler and Waldorf would be revisited in the first series of Muppets Tonight.) In both pilot episodes, Kermit the Frog only plays a supporting role.

Season 1 (1976–77)
Kermit the Frog becomes the host for the show from the start of the first season, while former host Nigel gets a part as the orchestra leader. Statler and Waldorf now watch the show from a balcony. Other characters from the pilots, including Dr. Teeth and the Electric Mayhem, Sam Eagle, The Swedish Chef, George the Janitor, Mildred Huxtetter, Crazy Harry, Brewster, and Droop continue to make appearances. Characters from previous Jim Henson productions also make appearances, including Rowlf the Dog, Sweetums and Robin the Frog (from The Frog Prince), Miss Piggy, Gonzo the Great, and Thog (from The Great Santa Claus Switch). New characters include Fozzie Bear, The Muppet Newsman, Scooter, Dr. Bunsen Honeydew, wardrobe lady Hilda, Uncle Deadly, Marvin Suggs and his Muppaphones, Trumpet Girl, and the singing duet of Wayne and Wanda. Recurring sketches include "Veterinarian's Hospital", "At the Dance", "Talking Houses", "Panel Discussions", "Fozzie's Monologue", "Talk Spot", "Muppet Labs" and "Gonzo's Act".

Season 2 (1977–78)
Several changes were made for the second season. Each week, Scooter would now greet the guest star in his or her dressing room before the opening theme song by announcing the time until curtain call. The opening theme sequence was replaced with the more familiar one, showing each cast member under an arch. Sketches such as "At the Dance", "Talk Spot", "Panel Discussions", "Talking Houses", and "Fozzie's Monologue" either made fewer appearances or were dropped altogether. Several characters were rebuilt, with noticeable changes in Miss Piggy, Fozzie Bear, Gonzo the Great, and Janice. Characters like George the Janitor, Hilda, Mildred, and Wayne and Wanda were dropped from the series (although Mildred would still make rare sporadic appearances). Robin is identified as Kermit's nephew. New sketches include "Pigs in Space" and "An Editorial by Sam the Eagle". New characters include Bunsen Honeydew's assistant Beaker, Link Hogthrob, Dr. Julius Strangepork, Doglion, and Annie Sue. Muppet performers Eren Ozker and John Lovelady departed from The Muppet Show after the first season. In early episodes of the second season, female puppeteers were auditioned to replace Ozker. Louise Gold was eventually hired as Ozker's replacement. Richard Hunt replaced Ozker as Janice's performer while Jerry Nelson took over the roles of Crazy Harry and The Announcer from John Lovelady. Jack Burns quit his role as writer after the first season.

Season 3 (1978–79)
The third season began promptly after the second season in the Spring of 1978, then took a summer and autumn break when Jim Henson went to work on production of The Muppet Movie, resuming in November 1978. All of the characters and sketches from the previous season remained. New characters included dimwitted stagehand Beauregard, boomerang fish thrower Lew Zealand, cafeteria lady Gladys, Bobby Benson and His Baby Band, and sports commentator Louis Kazagger. New segments included "Muppet Sports" and "Bear on Patrol". Two new puppeteers, Steve Whitmire and Kathryn Mullen, joined the troupe of Muppeteers during this season.

Season 4 (1979–80)
Most of the characters and sketches from the previous season remained. Canteen worker Gladys however, was replaced by a new character, Winny. Rizzo the Rat also made his earliest appearances, first as "Super Rat" in the episode which featured Christopher Reeve as its guest star.

Season 5 (1980–81)
The cold open featuring Scooter visiting the guest star's dressing room was replaced by a new opening in which Pops, the doorman, would greet each guest as they entered the theatre. New characters included Pops, Lips, and Gaffer the Cat. Two new puppeteers, Brian Muehl and Karen Prell, joined the troupe of Muppeteers during this season, and Betsy Baytos auditioned to perform in eight episodes.

References

External links
 

 Muppet Show
Lists of variety television series episodes
Lists of Disney television series episodes